Parazyxomma flavicans, the banded duskdarter, is a monophyletic species of dragonfly in the family Libellulidae. It is found in Benin, Botswana, Cameroon, the Democratic Republic of the Congo, Ivory Coast, Gabon, Gambia, Ghana, Guinea, Guinea-Bissau, Liberia, Malawi, Namibia, Nigeria, Senegal, South Africa, Uganda, Zambia, and Zimbabwe. Its natural habitats are swamps, freshwater lakes, intermittent freshwater lakes, freshwater marshes, and intermittent freshwater marshes.

References

Other 
 

Libellulidae
Taxonomy articles created by Polbot